The 2009 Sydney Roosters season was the 102nd in the club's history. They competed in the NRL's 2009 Telstra Premiership, finishing the regular season in last place and collecting the club's first wooden spoon since 1966.

Matches

Round By Round
All the Teams and Results round by round for Season 2009.

Round 1: South Sydney Rabbitohs 52 (Nathan Merritt 3, Fetuli Talanoa 2, Colin Best, Eddy Pettybourne, Chris Sandow, Rhys Wesser tries; Chris Sandow 5, Issac Luke 3 goals) def. Sydney Roosters 12 (Braith Anasta, Jake Friend tries; Craig Fitzgibbon 2 goals)

Team: Anthony Minichiello, Sam Perrett, Mitchell Aubusson, Iosia Soliola, Shaun Kenny-Dowall, Braith Anasta, Mitchell Pearce, Mark O'Meley, James Aubusson, Nate Myles, Lopini Paea, Craig Fitzgibbon, Setaimata Sa; Interchange: Frank-Paul Nuuausala, Shane Shackleton, Jake Friend, Martin Kennedy.

Round 2: Sydney Roosters 28 (Braith Anasta 2, Shaun Kenny-Dowall, Anthony Minichiello, Mitchell Pearce tries; Craig Fitzgibbon 3, Shaun Kenny-Dowall goals) def. Canberra Raiders 4 (Bronson Harrison try)

Team: Anthony Minichiello, Sam Perrett, Mitchell Aubusson, Iosia Soliola, Shaun Kenny-Dowall, Braith Anasta, Mitchell Pearce, Mark O'Meley, James Aubusson, Nate Myles, Willie Mason, Craig Fitzgibbon, Setaimata Sa; Interchange: Lopini Paea, Frank-Paul Nuuausala, Shane Shackleton, Ben Jones.

Round 3: Wests Tigers 40 (Chris Lawrence 2, Taniela Tuiaki 2, Dean Collis, Robbie Farrah, Tim Moltzen tries; Benji Marshall 6 Goals) def. Sydney Roosters 24 (Mitchell Aubusson 2, Braith Anasta, Shaun Kenny-Dowall tries; Craig Fitzgibbon 4 goals)				
Team: Ben Jones, Sam Perrett, Mitchell Aubusson, Iosia Soliola, Shaun Kenny-Dowall, Braith Anasta, Mitchell Pearce, Mark O'Meley, James Aubusson, Nate Myles, Willie Mason, Craig Fitzgibbon, Setaimata Sa; Interchange: Sonny Tuigamala, Lopini Paea, Frank-Paul Nuuausala, Shane Shackleton.

Round 4: Sydney Roosters 24 (Shaun Kenny-Dowall 2, Sam Perrett tries; Craig Fitzgibbon 6 goals) def. Parramatta Eels 6 (Jarryd Hayne try, Luke Burt goal)

Team: Sam Perrett, Sisa Waqa, Mitchell Aubusson, Iosia Soliola, Shaun Kenny-Dowall, Braith Anasta, Mitchell Pearce, Mark O'Meley, James Aubusson, Frank-Paul Nuuausala, Shane Shackleton, Craig Fitzgibbon, Setaimata Sa; Interchange: Lopini Paea, Martin Kennedy, Jake Friend, Rohan Ahern.

Round 5: Brisbane Broncos 28 (Karmichael Hunt 2, Antonio Winterstien 2, Steve Michaels tries; Corey Parker 4 goals) def. Sydney Roosters 24 (Braith Anasta, Willie Mason, Mitchell Pearce, Sam Perrett tries; Braith Anasta 3, Craig Fitzgibbon goal)

Team: Sam Perrett, Sisa Waqa, Mitchell Aubusson, Setaimata Sa, Shaun Kenny-Dowall, Braith Anasta, Mitchell Pearce, Mark O'Meley, James Aubusson, Frank-Paul Nuuausala, Nate Myles, Craig Fitzgibbon, Shane Shackleton; Interchange: Lopini Paea, Willie Mason, Jake Friend, Ben Jones.

Round 6: New Zealand Warriors 17 (Stacey Jones, Jerome Ropati, Manu Vatuvei tries; Denan Kemp 2 goals; Stacey Jones field goal) def. Sydney Roosters 16 (Mitchell Pearce, Shane Shackleton, Iosia Soliola tries; Craig Fitzgibbon 2 goals)

Team: Sam Perrett, Sonny Tuigamala, Ben Jones, Iosia Soliola, Shaun Kenny-Dowall, Braith Anasta, Mitchell Pearce, Mark O'Meley, James Aubusson, Frank-Paul Nuuausala, Nate Myles, Craig Fitzgibbon, Shane Shackleton; Interchange: Lopini Paea, Willie Mason, Jake Friend, Jordan Tansey.

Round 7: St. George Ilawarra Dragons 29 (Jamie Soward 2, Brett Morris, Jason Nightingale tries; Jamies Soward 6 goals, field goal) def. Sydney Roosters 0.

Team: Sam Perrett, Sisa Waqa, Iosia Soliola, Setaimata Sa, Shaun Kenny-Dowall, Braith Anasta, Mitchell Pearce, Mark O'Meley, James Aubusson, Frank-Paul Nuuausala, Wilie Mason, Nate Myles, Craig Fitzgibbon; Interchange: Lopini Paea, Shane Shacleton, Jake Friend, Jordan Tansey.

Round 8: Sydney Roosters 19 (Shaun Kenny-Dowall 2, Sam Perrett tries; Craig Fitzgibbon 3 goals; Braith Anasta field goal) def. Cronulla Sharks 12 (Paul Gallen, Reece Williams tries; Luke Covell 2 goals)

Team: Jordan Tansey, Sam Perrett, Setaimata Sa, Ben Jones, Shaun Kenny-Dowall, Braith Anasta, Mitchell Pearce, Nate Myles, James Aubusson, Frank-Paul Nuuausala, Iosia Soliola, Craig Fitzgibbon, Shane Shacleton; Interchange: Lopini Paea, Willie Mason, Jake Friend, Rohan Ahern.

Round 9: Melbourne Storm 28 (Brett Finch, Ryan Hoffman, Jeff Lima, Steve Turner, Brett White tries; Joseph Tomane 4 goals) def. Sydney Roosters 12 (Sam Perrett, Setaimata Sa tries; Craig Fitzgibbon 2 goals)

Team: Jordan Tansey, Sam Perrett, Setaimata Sa, Ben Jones, Shaun Kenny-Dowall, Braith Anasta, Mitchell Pearce, Nate Myles, James Aubusson, Frank-Paul Nuuausala, Iosia Soliola, Willie Mason, Craig Fitzgibbon; Interchange: Lopini Paea, Jake Friend, Nick Kouparitsas, Sisa Waqa.

Round 10: Newcastle Knights 38 (Jarrod Mullen 2, Zeb Taia 2, Danny Wicks, Cooper Vuna; Kurt Gidley 7 goals) def. Sydney Roosters 6 (Jordan Tansey try; Braith Anasta goal)

Team: Jordan Tansey, Sam Perrett, Setaimata Sa, Sisa Waqa, Shaun Kenny-Dowall, Braith Anasta, Mitchell Pearce, Nate Myles, Jake Friend, Lopini Paea, Iosia Soliola, Willie Mason, Craig Fitzgibbon; Interchange: Ben Jones, Frank-Paul Nuuausala, Mark O'Meley, Nick Kouparitsas.

Round 11: Penrith Panthers 48 (Michael Jennings 3, Wade Graham 2, Lachlan Coote, Shane Elford, Luke Lewis, Frank Pritchard tries; Jarrod Sammut 3, Luke Walsh 3 goals) def. Sydney Roosters 6 (Ben Jones try, Braith Anasta goal)

Team: Braith Anasta, Shaun-Kenny-Dowall, Setaimata Sa, Sam Perrett, Sonny Tuigamala, Ben Jones, Mitchell Pearce, Nate Myles, Jordan Tansey, Mark O'Meley, Shane Shackleton, Willie Mason, Lopini Paea; Interchange: Frank-Paul Nuuausala, Nick Kouparitsas, Tom Symonds, Stanley Waqa.

Round 13: Manly Sea Eagles 38 (Michael Robertson 2, Steve Matai, Glenn Stewart, Anthony Watmough, David Williams, Tony Williams tries; Matt Orford 5 goals) def. Sydney Roosters 18 (Shaun Kenny-Dowall 2, Setaimata Sa, Ben Jones tries; Craig Fitzgibbon goal)

Team: Sam Perrett, Sonny Tuigamala, Setaimata Sa, Ben Jones, Shaun Kenny-Dowall, Braith Anasta, Mitchell Pearce, Mark O'Meley, Jake Friend, Lopini Paea, Shane Shackleton, Willie Mason, Craig Fitzgibbon; Interchange: Nate Myles, Frank-Paul Nuuausala, Tom Symonds, Jordan Tansey.

Round 14: Gold Coast Titans 24 (Aaron Cannings, Nathan Friend, Esi Tonga, Chris Walker tries; Scott Prince 4 goals) def. Sydney Roosters 20 (Sisa Waqa 2, Mitchell Pearce, Tom Symonds tries; Braith Anasta, Craig Fitzgibbon goals)

Team: Sam Perrett, Sisa Waqa, Setaimata Sa, Ben Jones, Shaun Kenny-Dowall, Braith Anasta, Mitchell Pearce, Mark O'Meley, Jake Friend, Nate Myles, Shane Shackleton, Anthony Cherrington, Craig Fitzgibbon; Interchange: Lopini Paea, Frank-Paul Nuuausala, Tom Symonds, Mitchell Aubusson.

Round 15: North Queensland Cowboys 24 (Travis Burns, Aaron Payne, Steve Southern, Carl Webb tries; John Williams 4 goals) def. Sydney Roosters 22 (Mitchell Aubusson, Anthony Cherrington, Shane Shackleton, Ben Jones tries; Craig Fitzgibbon 3 goals)

Team: Sam Perrett, Sisa Waqa, Ben Jones, Mitchell Aubusson, Shaun Kenny-Dowall, Braith Anasta, Mitchell Pearce, Lopini Paea, Jake Friend, Shane Shackleton, Iosia Soliola, Anthony Cherrington, Craig Fitzgibbon; Interchange: Ray Moujalli, Frank-Paul Nuuausala, Tom Symonds, Rohan Ahern.

Round 16: Sydney Roosters 19 (Shaun Kenny-Dowall, Mitchell Pearce, Sam Perrett tries; Craig Fitzgibbon 3 goals; Mitchell Pearce Field Goal) def. Cronulla Sharks 12 (Blake Ferguson, Nathan Stapleton tries; Luke Covell 2 goals)

Team: Sam Perrett, Sandor Earl, Mitchell Aubusson, Ben Jones, Shaun Kenny-Dowall, Setaimata Sa, Mitchell Pearce, Nate Myles, Jake Friend, Lopini Paea, Anthony Cherrington, Willie Mason, Craig Fitzgibbon; Interchange: Shane Shackleton, Frank-Paul Nuuausala, Tom Symonds, Nick Kouparitsas.

Round 17: St. George Illawarra Dragons 34 (Matt Prior 2, Jamie Soward 2, Neville Costigan, Wendell Sailor tries; Jamie Soward 5 goals) def. Sydney Roosters 12 (Craig Fitzgibbon 2 tries, 2 goals)

Team: Sam Perrett, Sandor Earl, Mitchell Aubusson, Ben Jones, Shaun Kenny-Dowall, Setaimata Sa, Mitchell Pearce, Nate Myles, Jake Friend, Lopini Paea, Anthony Cherrington, Willie Mason, Craig Fitzgibbon; Interchange: Shane Shackleton, Frank-Paul Nuuausala, Tom Symonds, Nick Kouparitsas.

Round 19: New Zealand Warriors 30 (Manu Vatuvei 2, Patrick Ah Van, Stacey Jones, Simon Mannering, Wade McKinnon tries; Stacey Jones 3 goals) def. Sydney Roosters 24 (Tom Symonds 2, Willie Mason, Ben Jones tries; Craig Fitzgibbon 4 goals)

Team: Sam Perrett, Sandor Earl, Mitchell Aubusson, Tom Symonds, Shaun Kenny-Dowall, Ben Jones, Mitchell Pearce, Shane Shackleton, Jake Friend, Frank-Paul Nuuausala, Setaimata Sa, Willie Mason, Craig Fitzgibbon; Interchange: Lopini Paea, Stanley Waqa, Anthony Cherrington, Nick Kouparitsas.

Round 20: South Sydney Rabbitohs 40 (Jamie Simpson 3, Issac Luke, Nathan Merritt, Eddy Pettybourne, John Sutton, Craig Wing tries; Chris Sandow 4 goals) def. Sydney Roosters 20 (Mitchell Aubusson, Jake Friend, Shaun Kenny-Dowall, Mitchell Pearce tries; Shaun Kenny-Dowall 2 goals)

Team: Sam Perrett, Anthony Minichiello, Mitchell Aubusson, Tom Symonds, Shaun Kenny-Dowall, Ben Jones, Mitchell Pearce, Frank-Paul Nuuausala, Jake Friend, Lopini Paea, Setaimata Sa, Willie Mason, Iosia Soliola; Interchange: Shane Shackleton, Stanley Waqa, Rohan Ahern, Nick Kouparitsas.

Round 21: Sydney Roosters 30 (Craig Fitzgibbon, Willie Mason, Mitchell Pearce, Iosia Soliola, Setaimata Sa tries; Craig Fitzgibbon 5 goals) def. Newcastle Knights 18 (Kurt Gidley 2, Adam MacDougall tries; Kurt Gidley 3 goals)

Team: Sam Perrett, Shaun Kenny-Dowall, Mitchell Aubusson, Setaimata Sa, Iwi Hauraki, Ben Jones, Mitchell Pearce, Frank-Paul Nuuausala, Jake Friend, Lopini Paea, Iosia Soliola, Willie Mason, Craig Fitzgibbon; Interchange: Stanley Waqa, Shane Shackleton, Riley Brown, Nick Kouparitsas.

Round 22: Wests Tigers 17 (Beau Ryan 2, Taniela Tuiaki tries; Benji Marshall 2 goals; Robbie Farrah field goal) def. Sydney Roosters 10 (Shaun Kenny-Dowall, Setaimata Sa tries; Craig Fitzgibbon goal) *Sin Bin: Mitchell Aubusson.

Team: Sam Perrett, Iwi Hauraki, Mitchell Aubusson, Setaimata Sa, Shaun Kenny-Dowall, Anthony Minichiello, Mitchell Pearce, Frank-Paul Nuuausala, Jake Friend, Lopini Paea, Iosia Soliola, Willie Mason, Craig Fitzgibbon; Interchange: Stanley Waqa, Shane Shackleton, Riley Brown, Ben Jones.

Round 23: Manly Sea Eagles 44 (Michael Robertson 2, David Williams 2, Jason King, Matt Orford, Glenn Stewart tries; Matt Orford 6, Jamie Lyon 2 goals) def. Sydney Roosters 12 (Shaun Kenny-Dowall, Iwi Hauraki tries; Craig Fitzgibbon 2 goals)

Team: Sam Perrett, Iwi Hauraki, Mitchell Aubusson, Setaimata Sa, Shaun Kenny-Dowall, Anthony Minichiello, Mitchell Pearce, Frank-Paul Nuuausala, Jake Friend, Lopini Paea, Iosia Soliola, Willie Mason, Craig Fitzgibbon; Interchange: Stanley Waqa, Shane Shackleton, Riley Brown, Ben Jones.

Round 24: Bulldogs 28 (Luke Patten 2,Hazem El Masri, Josh Morris, David Stagg tries; Hazem El Masri 4 goals def. Sydney Roosters 4 (Ben Jones try)

Team: Sam Perrett, Iwi Hauraki, Mitchell Aubusson, Ben Jones, Shaun Kenny-Dowall, Anthony Minichiello, Mitchell Pearce, Frank-Paul Nuuausala, Riley Brown, Shane Shackleton, Iosia Soliola, Setaimata Sa, Craig Fitzgibbon; Interchange: Jake Friend, Willie Mason, Stanley Waqa, Nate Myles.

Round 25: Melbourne Storm 38 (Greg Inglis 2, Steve Turner 2, Will Chambers, Billy Slater, Aiden Tolman tries; Cameron Smith 5 goals) def. Sydney Roosters 4 (Shaun Kenny-Dowall try)

Team: Sam Perrett, Iwi Hauraki, Mitchell Aubusson, Ben Jones, Shaun Kenny-Dowall, Anthony Minichiello, Mitchell Pearce, Frank-Paul Nuuausala, Riley Brown, Shane Shackleton, Iosia Soliola, Nate Myles, Craig Fitzgibbon; Interchange: Jake Friend, Willie Mason, Stanley Waqa, Khalid Deeb.

Round 26: North Queensland Cowboys 32 (Ashley Graham, Donald Malone, Johnathan Thurston, Willie Tonga, Shane Tronce, Ty Williams tries; Johnathan Thurston 4 goals) def. Sydney Roosters 16 (Iwi Hauraki, Shaun Kenny-Dowall, Willie Mason tries; Craig Fitzgibbon 2 goals)

Team: Sam Perrett, Iwi Hauraki, Mitchell Aubusson, Ben Jones, Shaun Kenny-Dowall, Anthony Minichiello, Mitchell Pearce, Frank-Paul Nuuausala, Riley Brown, Shane Shackleton, Iosia Soliola, Nate Myles, Craig Fitzgibbon; Interchange: Stanley Waqa, Willie Mason, Jake Friend, Martin Kennedy.

Season Summary

2009 squad

Ladder

Transfers 2010

2010 Gains
 JP Du Plessis (South African Rugby Union)
 Daniel Conn (Gold Coast Titans)
 Todd Carney (Canberra Raiders)
 Phil Graham (rugby league) (Canberra Raiders)
 Jared Waerea-Hargreaves (Manly Sea Eagles)
 Jason Ryles (Catalans Dragons)
  Brad Takairangi (South Sydney Rabbitohs NYC) 
  Jason Baitieri (Parramatta Eels NYC)
  Aiden Guerra (Melbourne Storm)

2010 Losses 
 Craig Fitzgibbon (Hull) 
 Iosia Soliola (St Helens R.F.C.)
 Shane Shackleton (Parramatta Eels) 
 Mark O'Meley (Hull)

Mid-Season 2009 Transfers

Losses 
 Jordan Tansey (Hull)

References 

Sydney Roosters seasons
Sydney Roosters season